All-women shortlists (AWS) is an affirmative action practice intended to increase the proportion of female Members of Parliament (MPs) in the United Kingdom, allowing only women to stand in particular constituencies for a particular political party. Only the Labour Party and Liberal Democrats currently use this practice. However, Labour abandoned the shortlist for general election purposes in March 2022. Political parties in other countries, such as South Korea and various Latin American countries, have used practices analogous to AWS, especially in relation to government sex quotas.

United Kingdom

Background
In the 1990s, women constituted less than 10% of MPs in the House of Commons of the UK Parliament. Political parties used various strategies to increase female representation, including encouraging women to stand and constituency associations to select them, and providing special training for potential female candidates.
Another strategy, the creation of all-women shortlists, is a positive discrimination strategy making it compulsory for selection of women candidates in some constituencies.

For the 1992 general election, the Labour Party had a policy of ensuring there was at least one statutory female candidate on each of its shortlists, however few of these women were successful in being selected in winnable seats (seats within a 6% swing). Following polling that suggested women were less likely to vote Labour than men, the party introduced All-women shortlists at their 1993 annual conference.

1997 general election

Labour used all-women shortlists to select candidates in half of all winnable seats for the 1997 general election, with the aim of reaching 100 female MPs post-election; a goal that was achieved. The shortlists provoked controversy, however. In 1996, Labour Party branches in Croydon Central, Merthyr Tydfil & Rhymney, Bishop Auckland and Slough all submitted hostile motions criticising the policy.

Concern about such sex discrimination was especially strong in Slough where the local party refused to even co-operate in selecting a candidate after having an AWS imposed. Another concern was that AWS were being used as a device to keep out certain men who might have made trouble for Tony Blair, Prime Minister at the time; then-Labour Party leader Blair stated that AWS were "not ideal at all" in 1995.

In December 1995, Peter Jepson and Roger Dyas-Elliott, prevented from standing on Labour shortlists because of their gender, challenged the policy in court. Supported by the Equal Opportunities Commission, they claimed that they had been illegally barred from applying to be considered to represent the party and that the policy contradicted Labour's policy of aiming to promote equality of opportunity.
 In January 1996, an industrial tribunal found the Labour Party had broken the law, unanimously ruling that all-women shortlists were illegal under the Sex Discrimination Act 1975 in preventing men from entering a profession.

The 34 candidates who had already been selected by all-women shortlists were not required to seek re-selection, but all 14 unfinished all-women shortlist selections were suspended. Jepson and Dyas-Elliott did not seek compensation for their loss.
At the 1997 general election, 35 out of 38 Labour AWS candidates were elected.

The Conservative Party also opposed gender quotas, preferring to persuade constituencies to select female candidates in winnable seats.

Prior to the 1999 European parliament elections, the Liberal Democrats used a system called "zipping" in which equal numbers of men and women were elected as MEPs.

2005 general election
Following the reduction in female MPs after the 2001 general election and increased lobbying by gender equality advocates, Labour introduced the Sex Discrimination (Election Candidates) Act 2002, which allows parties to use positive discrimination in the selection of candidates. They were to remain legalised until the end of 2015, due to a "sunset clause" in the Act, but that deadline was extended to 2030 as part of the Equality Act 2010.

In contrast, the Liberal Democrats rejected a proposal to use AWS in 2001; suggesting such shortlists were illiberal and unnecessary. Prominent women MPs of the party opposed the use of all-women shortlists. Party members argued that the main problem was not discrimination, but a lack of female candidates. Instead the party set a target of having 40% female candidates in winnable seats.

At the 2005 general election, the shortlists helped to increase the number of female MPs in Parliament to 128, with the Labour Party's 98 women constituting 77% of the total. However, a Labour-controlled "safe seat" was lost when explicitly anti-AWS independent candidate Peter Law won the Blaenau Gwent constituency in Wales beating Maggie Jones who had been selected using Labour's All-women shortlist policy. The loss was widely blamed on controversy over AWS.

2010 general election
A Speaker's conference was set up in 2008 to study the reasons why MPs were predominantly white, male and able-bodied. An interim report released in July 2009 called for women to make up at least 50% of new candidates at the following general election. However, all-women shortlists continued to elicit criticism. Then-Conservative Ann Widdecombe criticised the use of AWS stating that women in the past who fought for equality such as the suffragettes "wanted equal opportunities not special privileges" and "they would have thrown themselves under the King's horse to protest against positive discrimination and all-women shortlists".

Diane Abbott, one of the early supporters of all-women shortlists criticised their failure to recruit ethnic minority women into politics, stating that they had in effect "been all white women shortlists" As evidence of this claim, she cited the 1997 Parliamentary intake; where none of the MPs selected using all-women shortlists were black.
Conservative Party leader David Cameron tried to institute AWS in 2006. There was opposition from some female Conservative MPs, such as Nadine Dorries and Ann Widdecombe.

In October 2009, David Cameron stated that the under-representation of women and ethnic minorities was "a real problem for Parliament and for my party", and reversed his opposition to AWS. In February 2010, he indicated that he would impose AWS because the pace of change towards the selection of more female MPs had been too slow.
In 2009, Liberal Democrat leader Nick Clegg stated that he would consider introducing all-women shortlists if the number of female MPs did not increase following the next election, but he did not see this as a long-term solution for the unrepresentative nature of parliament.

2015 general election 
The Conservative Party used AWS for selection of a few candidates in the 2015 general election. Helen Whately was selected in Faversham and Mid Kent.

2017 general election
At the 2017 election, a "record number of female MPs" entered Parliament, although the gender balance was highly skewed between parties. In Labour, 45% of MPs were women, in the Scottish National Party 34%, in the Liberal Democrats 33%, but in the Conservatives just 21%. This meant the House of Commons was 32% women overall.

2019 general election
The record for most female MPs elected was broken at the 2019 election, which marked the first time that female representation in the House of Commons is more than 33%. It saw an increase in the percentage of women elected from both Conservative and Labour. Although 51% of Labour MPs are now women, the lack of any stop mechanism in party rules means preferential AWS shortlists may continue this rise until the legal exception sunsets in 2030. The most Conservative women in their party's history entered the House after this election, without the aid of an AWS. The Liberal Democrats held the highest percentage of any party's female MPs represented despite a small increase in the number of first-time members elected, which was the case for the SNP.

Impact
All-women shortlists had been credited with breaking down prejudices that impeded the selection of women and discouraged women from offering their candidacy. In both 1997 and 2005, 50% of women MPs elected were selected from all-women shortlists.

The increase in women in politics brought increased parliamentary priority to issues such as women's health, domestic violence against women, and childcare. In addition, the increased number of women MPs and greater focus on women's concerns likely resulted in increased female support for Labour at the polls. AWS may also have made it easier for women to be selected non-all-women shortlist seats. The shortlists also gave rise to the appointment of the first British female Home Secretary, Jacqui Smith in June 2007.

After Labour was warned that continuing with all-women shortlists for parliamentary elections would become an "unlawful" practice again under the Equality Act (because the majority of their MPs are female), HuffPost reported that the party abandoned them in March 2022.

Other countries
Many countries today use political gender quotas.
Among the first to use party reservations for female candidates by political parties were Norway, Sweden and Denmark. In 1983, the Norwegian Labour Party mandated that "at all elections and nominations both sexes must be represented by at least 40 per cent", and in 1994, the Swedish Social Democratic Workers' Party mandated  "every second on the list a woman", which meant that male and female candidates would be alternated between each other on the party list of preferred candidates, a format known as a "zipper quota". The quota was imposed on 290 local parties by the national party organization. Furthermore, the party created a handbook for women with advice about how to seek political office. In 1988, the Danish Social Democrats "each sex has the right to a representation of at least 40 per cent of the Social Democratic candidates for local and regional elections. If there is not a sufficient number of candidates from each sex, this right will not fully come into effect"; however, this party law was abolished in 1996.

Iraq held its first post-Saddam parliamentary elections in January 2005 under an electoral law providing for compulsory integration of women on the candidate lists, like several European countries with a proportional electoral system.

Latin America 
Latin American political parties' gender policies for candidates often have a relationship to their respective countries' legalized gender quotas for governing bodies. Fourteen Latin American countries have such a quota for their legislatures; these countries consist of Argentina, Bolivia, Brazil, Colombia, Costa Rica, Dominican Republic, Ecuador, Guyana, Honduras, Mexico, Panama, Paraguay, Peru, and Uruguay. Political parties in Latin American countries utilize a variety of systems to pick their candidates for office, with Argentina, Chile, and Uruguay having "fairly informal selection rules" for their candidates, in which party elites have large amounts of influence, while those in Paraguay and Costa Rica use more stringent methods of selection described by formal and written rules within the political parties. Political parties with more bureaucratized, stricter candidate selection processes in Latin American countries with legislative-body quotas run women as, on average, 37.8% of their candidates for legislative bodies, while in those parties with less formalized selection processes, on average, women constitute 31.5% of candidates.

South Korea 
South Korea has a system in which gender quotas exist for its single national legislative body, the National Assembly, with a requirement that women hold 30% of the National Assembly's 246 single-member constituency seats and 50% of its 54 proportionally elected seats. However, "neither of the two major political parties has thus far nominated women to more than 10 percent of the single-member district seats," resulting in women constituting 15.7% of National Assembly members. This situation is largely due to the candidate selection process of South Korean political parties, whose "rules governing candidate selection lack routinization," allowing party leaders to have significant influence regarding candidates and the ability to circumvent gender quotas.

Criticisms 
All-women shortlists have been criticised as undemocratic, as "bypassing competitive principles and hence as ignoring the merit principle,"  and as "a form of discrimination against men." Labour's policy of all-women shortlists was challenged successfully in court in 1996, when an industrial tribunal found the Labour Party had broken the law, unanimously ruling that all-women shortlists were illegal under the Sex Discrimination Act 1975 in preventing men from entering a profession.

One category of criticism asserts that gender quotas represent a positive step, but do not accomplish enough. Some criticism in this vein asserts that quotas should include penalties for groups who do not follow them. Similarly, some critics argue that quotas in corporations in addition to those in governing bodies, should be instituted among other measures to improve public and private sector career opportunities for women.

However, other critics believe that gender quota policies, like those of which all-women shortlists represent a subset, do not, no matter their requirements, provide a way for women to achieve equality in government. For instance, some critics in this arena believe that gender quotas and debate regarding them does not represent real or substantive gains for women. Similarly, some criticisms of gender quotas, including all-women shortlists, argue that even with quotas in place, societal norms discouraging women from holding leadership positions still prevent significant changes. More specifically, these critics assert that even when women do run for office under quota systems, they face a lack of monetary support and as a result often do not win elections.

See also
 Critical mass (gender politics)
 Identity politics
 List of female members of the House of Commons of the United Kingdom
 List of female political office-holders in the United Kingdom
 Parliament (Qualification of Women) Act 1918
 Positive discrimination
 Racial quota
 Reserved political positions
 Timeline of female MPs in the House of Commons
 Widow's succession
 Women in the House of Commons of the United Kingdom

References

Feminism in the United Kingdom
Sexism in the United Kingdom
Affirmative action
British women in politics
Election law in the United Kingdom
Political parties
Women's rights in the United Kingdom